Cronstadt Island is an island in the Republic of Trinidad and Tobago. One of the "San Diego Islands", it is an islet in the Gulf of Paria that lies between the “Bocas Islands” and “The Five Islands”.

See also
 Islands of Trinidad and Tobago

Islands of Trinidad and Tobago
Gulf of Paria